The Journal of Economic Geography is a bimonthly peer-reviewed academic journal published by Oxford University Press covering all aspects of economic geography, including the intersection between economics and geography. The editors-in-chief are Harald Bathelt (University of Toronto), Kristian Behrens (Université du Québec à Montréal), Neil Coe (National University of Singapore), Simona Iammarino (London School of Economics) and William R. Kerr (Harvard Business School).

Abstracting and indexing
The journal is abstracted and indexed in:

According to the Journal Citation Reports, the journal has a 2016 impact factor of 3.648.

References

External links 

Oxford University Press academic journals
Geography journals
Publications established in 2001
English-language journals
Bimonthly journals
Economics journals